"Get into Reggae Cowboy" is a song written by David Bellamy, and recorded by American country music duo The Bellamy Brothers.  It was released in July 1982 as the second single from the album When We Were Boys.  The song reached number 21 on the Billboard Hot Country Singles & Tracks chart.

Chart performance

References

1982 singles
1982 songs
The Bellamy Brothers songs
Elektra Records singles
Curb Records singles
Songs written by David Bellamy (singer)